John Danaher VC also known as John Danagher (25 June 1860 – 9 January 1919) was an Irish recipient of the Victoria Cross, the highest and most prestigious award for gallantry in the face of the enemy that can be awarded to British and Commonwealth forces.

Early life

Born in Limerick, Ireland, Danaher moved to South Africa shortly after the completion of his schooling. Upon the outbreak of the First Boer War, Danaher joined the Nourse's Horse (Transvaal), South African Forces.

Military career

He was 20 years old, and a Trooper, on an excursion from Pretoria with the Nourse's Horse (Transvaal) when the following deed took place for which he was awarded the VC.

On 16 January 1881 at Elandsfontein, near Pretoria, South Africa, Trooper Danaher, with a lance-corporal of the Connaught Rangers, (James Murray) advanced for 500 yards under heavy fire from a party of about 60 of the enemy, and brought out of action a private who had been severely wounded.

Danaher resigned from the Nourse's Horse in March 1881, and subsequently joined a British Army unit, the Connaught Rangers.  He returned to Limerick with the Rangers in 1882, and later achieved the rank of sergeant before retiring from military service in 1908. Danaher moved to Portsmouth, becoming a publican. He was the landlord of the Dog & Duck Public House at 115 Fratton Road, Portsmouth from 1913 until his death on 9 January 1919.  His wife, Mrs B. Danagher, succeeded him as Landlady and his son subsequently took over as Landlord in 1936/7.

His Victoria Cross is held by the National Army Museum (Chelsea, England).

References

Listed in order of publication year 
The Register of the Victoria Cross (1981, 1988 and 1997)

Ireland's VCs (Dept of Economic Development, 1995)
Monuments to Courage (David Harvey, 1999)
Irish Winners of the Victoria Cross (Richard Doherty & David Truesdale, 2000)
Portsmouth Memorial Page
 Profile

External links
Location of grave and VC medal (Hampshire)

1860 births
1919 deaths
19th-century Irish people
Irish recipients of the Victoria Cross
First Boer War recipients of the Victoria Cross
British military personnel of the First Boer War
British colonial army soldiers
Connaught Rangers soldiers
Military personnel from Limerick (city)
Burials in Hampshire